Garnet Fredrick Coleman (born September 8, 1961) is an American politician. From 1991 to 2022, he was a member of the Texas House of Representatives for the 147th district, located entirely within Houston and Harris County.

Early life and education
Coleman was born on September 8, 1961, in Washington, DC and raised in Houston, Texas.  His father is John B. Coleman, a Houston doctor.  As of 2006, the family of Coleman's father had lived in Houston's Third Ward neighborhood for over 100 years.

Coleman graduated from Jack Yates High School in Houston, and the University of Saint Thomas in Houston.

Coleman attended Howard University in Washington, D.C. and in 1990 graduated from the University of St. Thomas cum laude with a Bachelor of Arts. He also completed the Harvard University Senior Executive Program for State and Local Government.

Political career
Coleman was elected to his first term as a state representative in 1991 at age 29. His district includes Downtown Houston, the Hobby Airport area, Midtown Houston, Sagemont, and the Third Ward.

Coleman has been named Texas Monthly Ten Best Legislators List on two occasions. Most recently he received the 2005 Reintegration Award presented by Eli Lilly and Company, a national award given in acknowledgment of efforts to increase services and decrease the stigma associated with mental illness.

Incident with police officer

On July 14, 2015, Coleman was stopped by a police officer for driving 94 miles per hour. Coleman later said of the incident, "He talked to me like I was a child... He was so rude and nasty. Even when he found out I was a legislator, he became more rude and nasty. And I didn't understand why this guy was continuing to go on and on and treat me like a child. And basically like I'm saying is treat me like a boy. I want to be very clear about that." Even so, Coleman was neither issued a citation for speeding nor charged with perjury. However, KHOU and the Houston Chronicle later reported an analysis of the audio from a dashcam recording of Coleman's accusations against the police officer which appeared to show the police officer treating Coleman with respect and Coleman asking for special treatment.

Political positions

Coleman, in regards to the Third Ward, expressed his opposition to gentrification and a desire to keep the original residents in the neighborhood. Coleman had some control over the Midtown Tax Increment Financing District, which bought land in the Third Ward and enacted deeds restricting what may be done with the land, so that the land could indefinitely be used to house low income residents. In 2009, Coleman said "We learned a lot from the debacle in the Fourth Ward. So it would be stupid not to respond to the negative byproducts of rapid development. We want to find people who will make this community better by becoming part of its fabric, not by changing its fabric." In regards to the Fourth Ward in 2009, Coleman said that it cannot recapture the sense of community that it used to have. Coleman added "the residents got pushed to the suburbs, and the businesses got wiped away."

References

External links

Texas House of Representatives - Garnet Coleman official TX House website
Garnet Coleman official campaign website
Project Vote Smart - Representative Garnet F. Coleman (TX) profile
Follow the Money - Garnet Coleman
2006 2004 2002 2000 1998 campaign contributions

Democratic Party members of the Texas House of Representatives
1961 births
Living people
African-American state legislators in Texas
Harvard Kennedy School alumni
Howard University alumni
University of St. Thomas (Texas) alumni
21st-century American politicians
21st-century African-American politicians
20th-century African-American people